Selaya Fútbol Club is a football team based in Selaya in the autonomous community of Cantabria. Founded in 1931, the team plays in Tercera División RFEF – Group 3. The club's home ground is El Castañal, which has a capacity of 2,000 spectators.

Season to season

13 seasons in Tercera División
1 season in Tercera División RFEF

References

External links
Fútbol de Cantabria profile 
Arefe Regional profile 

Football clubs in Cantabria
Association football clubs established in 1931
Divisiones Regionales de Fútbol clubs
1931 establishments in Spain